The Khoso caretaker ministry was the Pakistani caretaker federal cabinet that was sworn into office on 2 April 2013. On 24 March 2013, Mir Hazar Khan Khoso was nominated by the Election Commission as the caretaker prime minister, out of four nominees coming from both the opposition and the dissolved government. Khoso was sworn into office on 25 March 2013.



Cabinet

2013
Khoso's cabinet was sworn into office on 2 April 2013, but were handed their official portfolios on 4 April 2013 with the exception of Sohail Wajahat Siddique, who received his portfolio at a later date.

At the swearing-in ceremony on 2 April 2013, 15 ministers were shortlisted for the cabinet but one chair was removed at the "eleventh hour". Dr Mushtaq Khan from Sindh was touted to become the caretaker federal minister of finance but dropped out at the last minute. Speculations around his absence suggested that Khan was stopped from taking his oath because he had been serving as the chief economist at the State Bank of Pakistan (SBP) and would have had to resign from the SBP before taking an oath in the caretaker setup.

References

2013 establishments in Pakistan